The Battle of Santiago may refer to:

Battles
 Battle of Santiago de Chile (1541), native insurrection against the Spanish
 Battle of Santiago (1660), an engagement between Dominican militia and French buccaneers
 Invasion of Cuba (1741), a British attempt to capture Santiago de Cuba
 Battle of Santiago de Cuba (1748), a failed attempt by the British Royal Navy to force entrance to the port of Santiago de Cuba
 Battle of Santiago (1844), battle fought at Santiago de los Caballeros, Santiago Province, on Hispaniola
 Battle of Santiago (1898), naval battle in the Spanish–American War
 Siege of Santiago (1898), also known as the Siege of Santiago de Cuba, last major action in Cuba fought during the Spanish–American War
 Battle of Santiago (1957), riots in Santiago, Chile in 1957

Sports
 Battle of Santiago (1962 FIFA World Cup), a football match between Chile and Italy during the 1962 FIFA World Cup which saw violent play and fighting on the pitch between the two teams

Music
 Battle of Santiago (band), Canadian Afro-Cuban post-rock band formed in 2011

See also
 Battle of Chacabuco (1817), battle that lead to the turnover of Santiago to independent Chile from Spain
 Battle of Monte Santiago (1827), battle between the Argentine Navy and Brazilian Imperial Navy during the Cisplatine War
 Action of April 3, 1836, battle between the Texan Navy and the Mexican Navy during the Texas Revolution, also known as the Battle of Brazos Santiago and Battle of Matamoros